George Ewart Evans (1 April 1909 – 11 January 1988) was a Welsh-born schoolteacher, writer and folklorist who became a dedicated collector of oral history and oral tradition in the East Anglian countryside from the 1940s to 1970s, and produced eleven books of collections of these materials.

Life and career
Evans was born in Abercynon, a coal-mining village north of Cardiff, one of a family of eleven, to Welsh-speaking parents who ran a grocery business. Reflecting the Liberal politics of his father, his middle name was inspired by William Ewart Gladstone, and Gladstone became one of his nicknames. As a boy he assisted in the delivery rounds travelling by pony and trap through the neighbouring farms and villages until the business closed following the 1924-5 coal strike. He went to grammar school, and studied classics at Cardiff University. After an unsuccessful attempt to move to London, he obtained work during the 1930s as a schoolmaster at Sawston Village College, Cambridgeshire, married, and started a family.

After serving in the Royal Air Force with wireless equipment during the Second World War, he moved briefly to London, and then in 1947 to the remote Suffolk village of Blaxhall, where his wife taught in the school. He then began to write, first stories, poetry and film scripts for the BBC. He contributed to the script of The Secret of the Forest, made by Rayant Pictures on location in Suffolk in 1955. Then he wrote a book about the people of the village of Blaxhall. This work (Ask The Fellows Who Cut The Hay) was, after many rejections, published by Faber and Faber in 1956, and the same house published the ten further books of similar character which Evans wrote over the next three decades.

The Evans family lived relatively simply, moving their home in the neighbourhood to Needham Market and Helmingham to follow the teaching posts, and at his wife's retirement they settled down finally in Brooke, a small Norfolk village, where George continued to write. Evans made extensive collections of oral history on tape relating to East Anglia, its village life, rural culture and dialect in a painstaking and sympathetic way, gathering anecdotes of the trades, the poverty, the migrant workers and the pre-modern rural way of life which was then still lingering in that comparatively sequestered corner of England.

He maintained a long correspondence with the writer Robert Graves, and collaborated with his friend David Thomson of the BBC on the book The Leaping Hare. Although his books have a strong flavour of memory and nostalgia, they record a time (extending back into the nineteenth century) that was hard and to which one would not seriously wish to return. He did not add a gloss of romance to his materials, but assumed and accepted the truthfulness of his informants.

Of the Blaxhall countryman, Evans wrote:
His knowledge is not a personal knowledge but has been available to him through oral tradition which is the unselfconscious medium of transmission. It is in his bones, you could say, and nonetheless valuable for that.... It was here at this time, and with the dressing and elaborating on it later, that I transposed the Blaxhall community in my own mind into its true place in an ancient historical sequence, keeping the continuity that was for ever changing, and for ever remaining the same, until an irreparable break substituted the machines for animal power, and put an end to a period that had lasted well over two thousand years.(The Crooked Scythe, pp.197-198)

Terry Pratchett described Evans's work (specifically regarding his book The Leaping Hare cowritten with David Thomson) as speaking "to the men who worked on the land—not from the cab of a tractor, but with horses—and they saw the wildlife around them. I suspect that maybe they had put a little bit of a shine on the things they told him, but everything is all the better for a little bit of shine".

Publisher and politician Matthew Evans, Baron Evans of Temple Guiting, is the son of George Ewart Evans. His daughter, Susan, married the artist David Gentleman.

Evans' life and works feature as a permanent exhibition at the Museum of East Anglian Life in Stowmarket, Suffolk.

Bibliography
 Three poems, in Modern Welsh Poetry, Keidrych Rhys (ed.), Faber and Faber, London, 1944
The Voices of the Children, Penmark Press, 1947
The Fitton Four-Poster,  Blackie and Son, 1954
Ask The Fellows Who Cut The Hay, Faber and Faber, 1956 (2009 edition illus. by David Gentleman)  
Welsh Short Stories, G. E. Evans (ed), with his own story, The Medal), Faber and Faber 1959, 2nd edn.
The Horse in the Furrow, Faber and Faber 1960
The Pattern Under the Plough: Aspects of the Folk-Life of East Anglia, Faber and Faber, 1966, Little Toller Books, 2013, introduced by Patrick Barkham
The Farm and the Village, Faber and Faber 1969
Where Beards Wag All: The Relevance of the Oral Tradition, Faber and Faber, 1970
The Leaping Hare, G. E. Evans and David Thomson, Faber and Faber, 1972
Acky, Faber and Faber, 1973
The Days That We Have Seen, Faber and Faber, 1975 
Let Dogs Delight and Other Stories, Faber  and Faber, 1975
From Mouths Of Men, Faber and Faber, 1976
Horse Power and Magic, Faber and Faber, 1979
The Strength of the Hills: An Autobiography, Faber and Faber, 1983; Farrar, Straus and Giroux, New York City)
Spoken History, Faber and Faber, 1987
 The Crooked Scythe. An Anthology of Oral History,  (ed. and ill. by David Gentleman, Faber and Faber, 1993

Criticism
Gareth Williams (1991), George Ewart Evans, University of Wales Press, (Writers of Wales series)

References

External links
The George Ewart Evans collection online - sound recordings held at the British Library.

20th-century Welsh writers
British folklorists
People from Abercynon
1909 births
1988 deaths
Alumni of Cardiff University
People from Brooke, Norfolk
People from Suffolk Coastal (district)